Théodore Turrettini (1845–1916) was a Swiss engineer and politician.

Life 
Théodore Turrettini was trained as an engineer at the Polytechnic School of Lausanne, where he graduated in 1867. He then left Switzerland to train in a workshop in Frankfurt, and at the Siemens & Halske factory in Berlin. He later spent a short while in Paris. Back to Geneva in 1870, he became director of the "Society of Physical Instruments", a position he would keep until his death. His duties included the development of precision instruments, of machines and of drills for the St.Gothard tunnel. He also attempted to collaborate with Raoul Pictet in order to develop machines for producing cold. 

After a two-months internship at Thomas Edison's workshop in New York, he even launched himself into electric lighting. 

Turrettini's main achievement was the creation of hydroelectric power stations in Geneva, which were the most powerful of the time. 
 
In 1891, Turrettini became a member of the International Niagara Commission.

References 
Paquier, Serge, "Turrettini, Théodore", in Dictionnaire Historique de la Suisse (in French).

1845 births
1916 deaths
Swiss engineers